The 1842 general strike, also known as the Plug Plot Riots, started among the miners in Staffordshire, England, and soon spread through Britain affecting factories, mills in Yorkshire and Lancashire, and coal mines from Dundee to South Wales and Cornwall.

Origins
The strike was influenced by the Chartist movement – a mass working class movement from 1838–1848. After the second Chartist Petition was presented to Parliament in May 1842, Stalybridge contributed 10,000 signatures. After the rejection of the petition the first general strike began in the coal mines of Staffordshire. The second phase of the strike originated in Stalybridge.

Civil unrest
A movement of resistance to the imposition of wage cuts in the mills, also known as the "Plug Riots", it spread to involve nearly half a million workers throughout Britain and represented the biggest single exercise of working class strength in nineteenth-century Britain.

On 13 August 1842, there was a strike at Bayley's cotton mill in Stalybridge, and roving groups of workers carried the stoppage first to the whole area of Stalybridge and Ashton, then to Manchester, and subsequently to towns adjacent to Manchester including Preston, using as much force as was necessary to bring mills to a standstill. The Preston Strike of 1842 resulted in a riot where four men were shot on 13 August at Lune Street. The West Riding of Yorkshire saw disturbances at Bradford, Huddersfield and Hunslet. At least six people died in a riot at Halifax.

Analysis
One perspective is that the movement remained, to outward appearances, largely non-political. Although the People's Charter was praised at public meetings, the resolutions that were passed at these were in almost all cases merely for a restoration of the wages of 1820, a ten-hour working day, or reduced rents.

In contrast, Mick Jenkins in The General Strike of 1842 offers a Marxist interpretation which sees the strike as becoming insurrectionary and intrinsically linked to the Chartist movement. "What clearly emerges... is the changing character of the strike--an understanding that the main aim of the strike was for the People's Charter" (p. 144). He cites resolutions in support of the Reform Bill and the Charter. Jenkins also sees the political nature of the strike expressed in the repression of the strikers: "When the meeting had assembled, a party of the Rifle Brigade charged into the crowd, and one man had his hand run through with a bayonet." (p. 143).

The repression that followed was "unmatched in the nineteenth century...In the North-West alone over 1,500 strikers were brought to trial" (p. 119). John Foster, in his introduction, argues that Jenkins' account of the strike "compels historians to reassess a number of crucial aspects in the country's political development" (p. 13). In considering universal suffrage, he argues that "historians have tended to emphasize the inevitability of Britain's progress towards majority rule. A study of 1842 supplies a useful corrective. It spurs us to look in a quite different direction to ask why universal suffrage was withheld for so long and what combination of forces made it possible to do this" (p. 14) and "how the demand for universal suffrage was successfully resisted, and in what way the working class was persuaded not to make political use again of its industrial strength ... poses the most interesting and fundamental problem" (p. 16).

See also

1842 Pottery Riots - these took place in the backdrop of the strike.

References

General Strike, 1842
General strikes in the United Kingdom
1842 in the United Kingdom